Utility Trailer Manufacturing Company is an American semi-trailer truck dry van, flatbed, and refrigerated van trailer manufacturing company, with its headquarters in the City of Industry, Los Angeles County, California, and sales office in Alpharetta, Georgia and a Parts Distribution Center in Batavia, Ohio.

Founded in 1914, the company also designs and manufactures dry freight vans, curtainsided trailers, and aerodynamic technologies.

Utility has six trailer manufacturing facilities in North America. Utility’s single temp and multi-temp refrigerated trailers are manufactured at the Atkins, Virginia, Clearfield, Utah and Piedras Negras, Mexico plants.  Utility’s dry vans are manufactured at the Glade Spring, Virginia and Paragould, Arkansas plants. Utility also manufactures several flatbed models including an aluminum/steel combination flatbed, an all-steel flatbed, drop decks, and curtainsided trailers, all produced at the Enterprise, Alabama facility.

The company also has an independent dealer network in over 100 locations in the United States, Canada, Mexico and South America. Authorized dealers offer trailer sales, aftermarket parts, and service.

References

Trucking industry in the United States
Companies based in the City of Industry, California
Manufacturing companies based in California
Vehicle manufacturing companies established in 1914
1914 establishments in California